The Cathedral Mountain Formation is a geologic formation in Texas. It preserves fossils dating back to the Permian period.

See also
 Geology of Texas
 List of fossiliferous stratigraphic units in Texas
 Paleontology in Texas
 Philip Burke King

References

Stratigraphy of Cathedral Mountain Formation

External links
 

Permian geology of Texas